Kwon Ha-lim (born 2 March 1999) is a South Korean diver. She qualified to compete at the 2020 Summer Olympics in the women's 10 metre platform diving event.

Personal life and family

Her father won gold medal at the 1986 Asian Games in the uneven bar event

References

1999 births
Living people
South Korean female divers
Olympic divers of South Korea
Divers at the 2020 Summer Olympics
Sportspeople from Seoul
21st-century South Korean women